Michel Chauvet Loo (born January 23, 1985) is a Mexican actor of television and films.

Filmography
 Vous êtes de la région? (2004) - Un Paysan 
 El hombre perfecto (2008) - Joaquin
 Sortilegio (2009) - Sergio
 Bienes raíces (2010) 
 Cu4tro Paredes (2010)
 Paramedicos (2010) - Chavo de Novatada
 Archivo 253 (2015) - Diego
 Ménage à trois (2015) - Damián 
 La querida del Centauro (2016) - Emilio Cobos
 Hasta que te conocí (2016) - Manuel Alvarado
 Enemigo (2016)

References

External links
 Personaje GQ: Michel Chauvet
 Michel Chauvet
 Michel Chauvet, el galán que podría ser tu nuevo crush
 https://rotativo.com.mx/entretenimiento/espectaculos-entretenimiento/399639-michel-chauvet-sera-nombrado-como-unos-de-los-10-hombres-mas-guapos/
 Michel Chauvet, feliz de formar parte de “Hasta que te conocí"
 Michel Chauvet
 biosstars-mx.com
 Chauvet no quiere ser un príncipe azul

21st-century Mexican male actors
1985 births
Living people
Male actors from Mexico City
Mexican male film actors
Mexican male television actors